Amazing Penguin, known in Japan as , is an action game for the Game Boy created by Natsume.

Gameplay
The player controls a penguin who must clear 40 levels worth of action. There are a certain number of lines with switches and dots that need activating. Once all the lines are cleared, so are any enemies that are remaining in that level. A strict time limit make players lose their lives in addition to bumping into an enemy.

There is no regularity to the movement of the character, giving an element of luck to the game. Some aspects of background graphics appear in certain levels (especially on levels 12, 20, 28, and 36). Level 40 is essentially a giant maze which leads up to a castle that ends the game.

Reception

References

1990 video games
Action video games
Fictional penguins
Game Boy games
Game Boy-only games
Natsume (company) games
Single-player video games
Video games about birds
Video games developed in Japan
Video games scored by Iku Mizutani